Heart of Greed (Traditional Chinese: 溏心風暴) was a 2007 grand production drama from Hong Kong's TVB. The main actors involved in this production were Moses Chan, Linda Chung, Louise Lee, Ha Yu, Michelle Yim and Susanna Kwan.

The series received critical acclaim from audiences in Hong Kong at the time, winning several awards at the TVB Anniversary Awards in 2007, including Best Drama. It tied as the second highest rated drama within the final minutes of its series finale. This resulted in Heart of Greed being just 2 points behind the highest rated drama on TVB in the 2000s A spin-off, Moonlight Resonance (溏心風暴之家好月圓), was produced and released in 2008 featuring the majority of the original cast and a different storyline. In 2022, the drama was selected as one of ten classic TVB dramas being honoured for a new joint Youku and TVB programme.

Plot
Tong Yan-Gai (Ha Yu) owns a dried sea-products and abalone store along with 31 shops for rental.  He has a total net worth $600 million HKD. He is married to Ling Hau (Louise Lee), a rich man's daughter and he also has a second wife called Wong Sau-Kam (Susanna Kwan), a former nurse who had previously taken care of Hau when Hau had cancer. Gai has 4 children: Tong Chi-On (Moses Chan), Tong Chi-Yat (Bosco Wong), Tong Chi-Yan (Fala Chen), by Ling Hau and Tong Chi-Foon (Lai Lok-yi) by Wong Sau-Kam. Hau had not expected to survive her bout with cancer and had wanted Kam to take care of her husband after she died, but fortunately she recovered. 

Kam thinks that she has no power in the family because she has no true status, as she is not truly legally married to Gai. She becomes a woman who instigates a range of petty acts that tend to come back to haunt her. She seeks the family fortune and in order to do that she causes trouble in the family. Hau becomes extremely frustrated and angry at Kam and expels her from the house.  This leads to Hau's cancer resurfacing. One day in the hospital, Hau lies on her deathbed, and Kam comes to beg for forgiveness for her past actions. She is unable to speak, but she finally mutters a few words only audible to the ears of her son Tong Chi-Foon. Her words are "普通朋友", which means "ordinary friend." Foon, however, lies to everybody and says that Hau told him that Kam is forgiven. Foon lies because his mother has put pressure on him to secure her a position in the family.

On the surface, it seems like a peaceful family, but Kam starts planning evil ideas with Sheung Joi-Duk (Lei Seng Cheung) and together they cause trouble. They plotted for years to find a means to steal the family fortune and Kam even created public false accusations against her own family in the media. Kam formed her own support group from the worst family members and in-laws to help plot against the Tong household in order to gain their family fortune. 

After much careful planning with Kam even going as far as to poison the public opinion about the Tong family. She also drives Gai into severe illness and eventual death from a stroke. Kam and Duk then begin a long war against the Tong family in an attempt to invalidate the family will so as to take over the family fortune for their own, as a means of punishing the Tong family's "mistreatment" towards her. The family is in mayhem and they have only one person who can help them, a lawyer, Sheung Joi-Sum (Linda Chung).

Cast

Tong Family

Sheung family

Cheuk family (the in-laws)

Others

Parody Cast and Main Characters (Within the Series)
Connie as Tong Yan Gai (唐仁佳)
Beduk as Ling Hau (凌巧)
Goku as Wong Sau Kam "Frances" (王秀琴)
Tsubame as Tong Chi On (唐直安)
Daeng as Ling Lei (凌莉)
Amalia as Ling Bo (凌波)
Yugo as Cheuk Man Lai "Jackie" (卓文丽)
Puteri as Tong Chi Yat "Gilbert" (唐直逸)
Hiro as Tong Chi Yan (唐直欣)

Characters

Tong Family
Tong Yan-Gai – Gai is a 58-year-old man who is in charge of the Tong family. He is a bubbly, fun and witty man who tries to run his family with laughs and joy. He is a self-proclaimed happy man of two wives, Ling Hau and Wong Sau Kam and four children, On, Yat, Foon, Yan. He owns a seafood store and 31 shops for rental worth $600 million HKD. He has a wealthy heritage and enjoys spending and giving the most of his time to his family. However, if things ever go wrong, he is known to chicken out and have no bravery whatsoever, giving him the name of Tong Yan Gwai (turtle). He is extremely protective of his children and would do whatever it takes to keep them safe and happy. Throughout the series, his character matures for the better, leading him to erase his Tong Yan Gwai nickname. Despite declining health due to stroke, he remembers Hau's words of wisdom in keeping his family together and he becomes a brave, generous and smart man, and he uses his newfound confidence to confront Wong Sau Kam in his final moments in life.
Ling Hau – Hau is a 57-year-old woman, and she is the leading lady of the Tong family. Although she is a loving woman who was born into a rich family, she is extremely smart and honest and can tell who is a good person and who is a bad person. She is powerful and strong in her ways and would do anything to keep the Tong family running smoothly with smiles on their faces. She foresees Kam's plotting antics and thus she kicks her out. During her declining health and final days of life, she spent them with her family in a happy manner. Even on her death bed, she was very straightforward in her act of not letting Kam back into her family.
Wong Sau-Kam – Kam is a 52-year-old woman who is second in charge of the Tong family and is a mistress of Tong Yan Gai. Kam used to be Hau's nurse when she had cancer and was supposed to be the spouse of Tong Yan Gai, but because Hong Kong law made it illegal to have more than one wife, she was forced to be an unofficial second wife to Gai. Kam is an ungrateful and sinister figure, and she strives to her best to retrieve the six hundred-million-dollar fortune of the Tong family. Kam is a highly petty and arrogant figure.  She's a constant schemer when it comes to making plans to make the Tong family unhappy. She easily likes people that side with her and often surround herself with unsavory characters that appeases her ego and helps her scheme ways to get what she believes the Tong family has long overdue owed her. She is a smart thinker when it comes to making plans to make the Tong family unhappy. She even forbade On, Yat, and Yan to send Gai off on his final journey when he died from a stroke. She is an unhappy woman after thinking that she would have her rightful position of the leading lady in Tong family; instead, she is neglected by Hau in her cheeky ways. At the end, she realises that she had been tricked by Duk and turns for the better, regretting her mistakes and becoming family again with the family.
Tong Chi-On – On is a 30-year-old man who strives to do his best for the Tong family. He has a helpful attitude toward his friends and family and keeps the smiles on everybody's faces. Although his manner is regarded as loving and caring, he is gullible in his relationships and trusts in people too easily often leading to disastrous results. His greatest desire is to find his real family, as he is an adopted son of the Tong family and not of true blood. It is later revealed, however, he is really Gai's son with a third woman. His love interest is Sheung Joi Sum and although she doesn't love him, he still cares for her. He is a comic character in the beginning but by the end he matures greatly. He stands in the place of Hau after her death and is also straightforward in his acts, rejecting Kam's return to the family, much to the dismay of his father.
Tong Chi-Yat, Tong Chi Foon, Tong Chi Yan – The remaining of Gai's children are 26, 21, and 17 years old respectively. Yat is an ambitious figure who strives to run a happy family with his controversial chain-smoking model wife, Cheuk Man-Lai (Tavia Yeung). Although Yat is ambitious, he listens to his mother and is similar to her in the way he is also straightforward. He is a figure that forgives and forgets. Foon is Kam's only son and he is a growing filmmaker who has just graduated. Foon is an innocent figure who suffers greatly from Kam's sudden outbursts which leads to her getting into trouble with family. He is character trying to find his place in a family without his mother. Yan is a youthful and playful figure who is always a pleasure to be around. She is a flirty at the beginning but slowly matures during the series. She loves her family members but can be very moody when she discovers that some of them are traitors.
Ling Lei – Lei is the 45-year-old sister of Hau and is extremely biased and moody, especially against Kam. She wants the best for the Tong family and is the main reason for the Tong family's wealth. She, like her sister is straightforward and willing to forgive and forget. She stands in place of Hau and Gai after their deaths. She is loving of her family but strict in many ways.
Ling Bo – Bo is the 37-year-old greedy brother of Hau and Lei. He was a loving uncle when Hau was around, but became greedy after being bribed with cheques by Kam to side with her and with the fact that he inherited HK$8 million before he was 20 when the Lings' father died. He was invited join Kam's side for a stake in the family assets, and created uproars in the Tong family after gambling away large sums of money from his family's bank account. He also developed a great dislike to On, who mistakenly accused Bo of stealing more money.
Cheuk Man Lai Jackie and her family – Lai is a 26-year-old woman born to a dentist father and a servant mother. She started off as a controversial chain-smoking model, with a violent husband who she had no more feelings with. However, she continued to respect her husband's father and tried to conceal the details about her affair with Yat. After her divorce with her husband, she entered the Tong family, where very few people accepted her, including Hau. After the realisation of her mistakes, Hau accepts her. After she is accepted into the family and through thorough teachings from Hau, she matures to become a woman who loves the Tong family greatly and to be thankful all that she has in life. Lai's family, in return, is a complete contrast to her. As extremely greedy people, they use the Tong family as a bank, and took $5,000,000 HKD in one visit to fund the restaurant that Hau offered them as a gift for Yat and Lai's marriage and once requested 4 shops as a dowry. Lai's family ultimately combine with Kam and Duk's plot to obtain a share of the Tong assets. They are hated by the Tong's including Lai herself. They never regret their mistakes, even by the end. Tong Sum is the baby girl born to Jackie and Gilbert.

Others
Sheung Joi Sum – Sum is a peaceful 25-year-old girl and is a friend of Yan and On. She starts off the series as a poor, unconfident, struggling young woman trying to look after her father who has Alzheimer's disease.  She rejected On, who had feelings for her, because she loved another man, Ching Leung. She ends up working with On in a lawyer firm. They would eventually develop a relationship, but because of their misunderstandings they would often argue and break up various times. Their final break up would be after Leung begins a third-party relationship with her best friend, Ha. Later on in the series she matures into a blooming young lady and becomes a confident emerging lawyer. On finally has a chance to confront her with a proposal after Leung's death.
Ching Leung – Leung is a 27-year-old renowned lawyer. He is Sum's boyfriend towards the middle of the series. He is a moody but vigilant and caring figure who forever strives to do his best. Although he is a kind person, he has an inability to stay faithful and succumbs. At one point he had an affair with Sheung Joi Sum's best friend Shui Mak Mak, but he kept it quiet and reconciled with Sheung Joi Sum without admitting anything about the matter. Eventually information would slip and Sheung Joi Sum actively demands to know who was the other woman, but Ching felt exposing this matter would ruin everything and insists for her to drop the matter since he admitted his mistakes and assures Sheung Joi Sum it would never happen again. Sheung Joi Sum wasn't satisfied with such an answer and whenever he tried to comfort her, Tong Chi On would be around and he becomes jealous. After the big secret was exposed, everyone parted ways for some time and Leung would try to patch things between him and Sheung Joi Sum. Despite the fact that they broke up, Leung continues to love Sum. This is shown when he continues to write in his blog, Days without Sheung Joi Sum, three years after the break-up. He also helps Sheung Joi Sum think of ideas to defend Ling Lei. He eventually dies of a car crash in the end, because he was thinking about Sheung Joi Sum's decision to forgive him or not. Although he could be saved, he refuses to go to the hospital, using his final moments to tell Sheung Joi Sum ways to defeat Wong Sau-Kam. Sheung Joi Sum, who forgave Leung and is willing to renew their relationship, was greatly sadden by his death.
Shui Ming-Ha/Shui Mak Mak – Ha is Sum's best friend. She is a self-centered and power-hungry young woman who has experienced many relationships, often with them ending with disastrous results. During the series, she develops romantic feelings for Leung, and she eventually helps Leung cheat on Sum by being Leung's girlfriend, leaving Sum hurt when she finds out. Ha went away and said that she married but it wasn't true – she just wanted Sum to be happy. She returns one last time during Alfred's funeral, regretting and apologising to Sum for forgiveness.
Sheung Joi Duk – Duk He is Sum's older brother and is the main antagonist in the series. He manages to turn Kam against the Tong family whilst she was living by herself when being kicked out of the family mansion by Hau. He is a greedy, smart but forlorn character who comes up with plans of taking the Tong family to court being hungry for the six hundred million dollars and he suffers from hair loss. In spite of On's constant generous aid to him, he schemes to get a piece of the Tong's family fortune while having multiple affairs with several women in mainland China. It's he that gave the worst malicious plans for Kam to use against the Tong family after all On had done for him. After an unsuccessful court case for the Tong assets, Duk tried get a reason and convince her to fight for the Tong fortune again, Kam, angry at him for his lies, attempts to run him over. He is distraught and is never seen again.
Lai Cheuk Lan/Cho Bang – Cho Bang is Sum, Ha, and Yan's good friend. She appears mostly in the beginning of the series, and less more into the middle and end. She is a very cheerful and caring friend to Yan, Sum and Ha.

Ratings

List of episodes

Reception and Accolades
Initially, the reception for the series was excellent, garnering a massive 46 peak points and topping at 48 points within the final minutes of its series finale. This resulted in Heart of Greed being only 2 points behind the highest rated drama on TVB in the 2000s: Dae Jang Geum. Critical reaction was also excellent. This was shown when a massive crowd turned out to watch the finale in a shopping centre, Discovery Park, together with the cast. At the TVB Anniversary Awards ceremony in 2007, the cast and crew were nominated and won many of the awards, including the prestigious "Best Drama" award. Elsewhere, Heart of Greed has also won many awards and excellent reception. Time Out Hong Kong named the drama among the best 17 Hong Kong television dramas of all time.

List of awards and nominations

TVB Anniversary Awards – Best Drama
Heart of Greed
TVB Anniversary Awards – Best Actor in a Leading Role
Moses Chan
TVB Anniversary Awards – Best Actress in a Leading Role
Louise Li
TVB Anniversary Awards – Best Actor in a Supporting Role
Louis Yuen
TVB Anniversary Awards – My Most Favourite Male Character Role
Moses Chan
TVB Anniversary Awards – My Most Favourite Female Character Role
Susanna Kwan
Yahoo! Buzz Awards – Best Television Series
Heart of Greed
Yahoo! Buzz Awards – Most Watched Series
Heart of Greed
Mingpao Awards – Best Actress on Television
Louise Li
Mingpao Awards – Best Series on Television
Heart of Greed
The Next Magazine TV Awards 2008 – Next Magazine Top Ten TV Programmes
Heart of Greed
The Next Magazine TV Awards 2008 – Next Magazine Top Ten TV Artists
Louise Li
The Next Magazine TV Awards 2008 – Next Magazine Top Ten TV Artists
Moses Chan
The Next Magazine TV Awards 2008 – Next Magazine Top Ten TV Artists
Raymond Lam
The Next Magazine TV Awards 2008 – Next Magazine Top Ten TV Artists
Bosco Wong
The Next Magazine TV Awards 2008 – Next Magazine Top Ten TV Artists
Linda Chung
The Next Magazine TV Awards 2008 – Next Magazine Top Ten TV Artists
Susanna Kwan
2009 : 2008 ASTRO Wah Lai Toi's Award – Favourite Couple
Raymond Lam and Linda Chung
Television Committee Awards – Best Television Programs of 2007
Heart of Greed - 4th Place
Number One Television Awards – Actress with Most Potential
Fala Chen

List of nominations (Top 5 finalists)
TVB Anniversary Awards – Best Actor in a Leading Role
Ha Yu
TVB Anniversary Awards – Best Actress in a Leading Role
Linda Chung
TVB Anniversary Awards – Best Actress in a Leading Role
Susanna Kwan
TVB Anniversary Awards – My Most Favourite Male Character Role
Ha Yu
TVB Anniversary Awards – My Most Favourite Male Character Role
Raymond Lam
TVB Anniversary Awards – My Most Favourite Female Character Role
Linda Chung
TVB Anniversary Awards – My Most Favourite Female Character Role
Louise Li
TVB Anniversary Awards – Most Vastly Improved Actor
Lai Lok-yi
TVB Anniversary Awards – Most Vastly Improved Actress
Fala Chen

Indirect Sequels

Moonlight Resonance 

The series was successful enough to be commissioned for a sequel. The tentative title for the new series was Heart of Greed II with its Chinese title, 溏心風暴之家好月圓. The sales presentation clip was released on November 19, 2007, which featured Michelle Yim as the new villain and a mooncake business instead of Heart of Greed abalone. On June 9, 2008, its official working English title was released as Moonlight Resonance. The series surpassed the original in terms of support and viewership.

Heart and Greed 

Another series featuring several main cast members was released in 2017. The series was met with mixed to negative reviews.

DVD release

References

External links
TVB.com Heart of Greed – Official Website 
K for TVB.net Heart of Greed – Episodic Synopsis and Screen Captures

TVB dramas
2007 Hong Kong television series debuts
2007 Hong Kong television series endings